The 1983 Southwest Conference baseball tournament was the league's annual postseason tournament used to determine the Southwest Conference's (SWC) automatic bid to the 1983 NCAA Division I baseball tournament. The tournament was held from May 13 through 16 at Disch–Falk Field on the campus of The University of Texas in Austin, Texas.

The number 1 seed Texas Longhorns went 3–1 to win the team's 5th SWC tournament under head coach Cliff Gustafson.

Format and seeding 
The tournament featured the top four finishers of the SWC's 8 teams in a double-elimination tournament.

Tournament

References 

Tournament
Southwest Conference Baseball Tournament
Southwest Conference baseball tournament